Clostripain (clostridiopeptidase B, clostridium histolyticum proteinase B, alpha-clostridipain, clostridiopeptidase, Endoproteinase Arg-C) is a proteinase that cleaves proteins on the carboxyl peptide bond of arginine.  It was isolated from Clostridium histolyticum.  The isoelectric point of the enzyme is 4.8-4.9 (at 8 °C), and optimum pH is 7.4~7.8 (against α-benzoyl-arginine ethyl ester). The composition of the enzyme is indicated to be of two chains of relative molecular mass 45,000 and 12,500.

See also
 Benzoyl
 Ethyl ester

References

External links 
 
 

EC 3.4.22
Post-translational modification